Fabian Sejanes (born 4 September 1969) is an Argentine equestrian. He competed in the individual jumping event at the 2020 Summer Olympics.

References

External links

1969 births
Living people
Argentine male equestrians
Olympic equestrians of Argentina
Equestrians at the 2020 Summer Olympics
Sportspeople from Buenos Aires
Show jumping riders